Serhiy Drebot (born 16 May 1987, Ivano-Frankivsk) is a Ukrainian judoka. At the 2012 Summer Olympics he competed in the Men's 66 kg, but was defeated in the second round by Cho Jun-Ho.

References

External links
 
 

1987 births
Living people
Ukrainian male judoka
Sportspeople from Ivano-Frankivsk
Olympic judoka of Ukraine
Judoka at the 2012 Summer Olympics
Judoka at the 2015 European Games
European Games medalists in judo
European Games bronze medalists for Ukraine